Cry Terror! (aka The Third Rail) is a 1958 American thriller film starring James Mason, Inger Stevens, and Rod Steiger. The cast also featured Neville Brand, Jack Klugman and Angie Dickinson. The crime story was written and directed by Oscar-nominated screenwriter Andrew L. Stone.

Plot
Paul Hoplin (Rod Steiger) is the mastermind of a crime to collect a $500,000 ransom, threatening to use an explosive device that Jim Molner (James Mason) designed. He and his gang are holding Molner, wife Joan (Inger Stevens) and young daughter Patty (Terry Ann Ross) hostage in a house in Riverdale, Bronx.

FBI agents gather in New York with representatives of an airline. Hoplin has been sending anonymous notes, suggesting that a bomb will be planted on an aircraft. Joan Molner is forced to go alone to collect the ransom payment, while Hoplin's accomplices, a woman named Kelly (Angie Dickinson) and a man named Vince (Jack Klugman), watch her husband and child in a Brooklyn penthouse apartment.
Joan barely makes it back by the gang's deadline in time to prevent her husband's death. She is left alone with an ex-con, Steve (Neville Brand), who has a history of sexual assaults on women. Forced to defend herself, she kills Steve with a shard of glass.

Using the dental records of Kelly, the FBI find the hideout in Greenwich Village. They disarm Vince and shoot Kelly, wounding her. Now they must find Molner's wife, but Hoplin has seen newspaper reports that her husband and daughter are safe. She runs for her life into a subway, and when Hoplin pursues her, he steps on a third rail and is electrocuted.

Cast

 James Mason as Jim Molner 
 Inger Stevens as Joan Molner 
 Rod Steiger as Paul Hoplin 
 Neville Brand as Steve 
 Angie Dickinson as Eileen Kelly 
 Kenneth Tobey as Agent Frank Cole 
 Jack Klugman as Vince 
 Jack Kruschen as F.B.I. Agent Charles Pope 
 Carleton Young as Roger Adams 

 Barney Phillips as Dan Pringle 
 Harlan Warde as Bert 
 Ed Hinton as Operative
 Chet Huntley as himself
 Roy Neal as himself
 Jonathan Hole as Airline Executive
 William Schallert as Henderson
 Portland Mason as Patty's Friend on Schoolbus
 Terry Ann Ross as  Patty Molner

Production
With the working title of The Third Rail, the production was shot from early August to early September 1957 in New York City. For James Mason who had primarily taken on leading roles, with Cry Terror!, he began to take on "colorful supporting roles and character leads",  a direction he continued until the end of his acting career.

Reception

Box office
According to MGM records, Cry Terror! made $340,000 in the US and Canada and $680,000 elsewhere, resulting in a profit of $48,000.

Critical response
Cry Terror! was critically reviewed in The New York Times by Bosley Crowther. He noted that the film was a "pallid" thriller:"People who have a particularly low and permissive frightening point may get a few chills from "Cry Terror," which came to the Victoria yesterday. For this strictly-for-kicks melodrama, which Andrew and Virginia Stone have made on an undisguised low budget for Metro-Goldwyn-Mayer, is full of the sort of fast arm-twisting and menacing of innocent people with senseless perils that passes for ruthless realism among those patrons who don't like to use their heads."
Film critic Dennis Schwartz was not able to suspend his disbelief in his review of Cry Terror!:"Director-writer Andrew L. Stone presents an ill-conceived attempt at making a realistic thriller about a mad bomber extorting money in a terrorist plot via the 1950s. There are too many implausible occurrences for the narrative to handle and it all falls by the tracks in the climactic hysterical underground subway chase scene, which yields to Hollywood melodrama ... Unfortunately the story lacked the kind of tension it needed throughout and there were too many coincidences and contrived plot points to sustain interest."

See also
 List of American films of 1958

References

Notes

Citations

Bibliography

 Halliwell, Leslie. Leslie Halliwell's Film Guide. New York: Harper & Roe, 1989. .
 Maltin, Leonard. Leonard Maltin's Movie Encyclopedia. New York: Dutton, 1994. .

External links
 
 
 
 

1958 films
American crime thriller films
American aviation films
American black-and-white films
Film noir
Films directed by Andrew L. Stone
Metro-Goldwyn-Mayer films
1950s English-language films
1950s American films